Kathashilpa (literally, the Art of the Word), of 19, Shyamacharan De Street, Calcutta 700073 (now Kolkata) was founded in 1959 by Abani Ranjan Ray (1932–2008) and friends like Indranath Majumdar.  It became a rendezvous of radical intellectuals and artists of Calcutta, including those with extreme left sympathies. It stayed alive for more than thirty years and published a number of books that would later become classics in their respective fields. At present, the stewardship of the organization is in the hands of Mr. Dulal Burman, Dr. Amit Podder and Mr. Asit Poddar.

Left ideology, drama and folk art 
Abani Ranan Ray originally hailed from the Bankura district of West Bengal. Till 1952, he had been associated with the Bombay (now Mumbai) unit of the Indian People's Theatre Association, where he was very close to stalwarts like the linocut artist Chittaprasad Bhattacharya (1915–1978). In 1952 he came to Calcutta. In the 1950s West Bengal was going through a ferment. The ban on the Communist Party of India had been lifted and it had fared well in the general elections of 1952. Shortly after, the Food Movement electrified the political atmosphere. With his IPTA background, Abani Ranjan Ray himself had pronouncedly left leanings.  His close associates were mostly non-party left intellectuals such as Khaled Choudhury. The Kathashilpa logo was designed by Khaled Choudhury, arguably the last among the living legends of Bengali culture.
Kathashilpa was not just a publishing endeavour. It was a creative hub for various cultural activities, including drama and folk music. Several folk-singers and folk-specialists were close to it.  Ranen Ray Chowdhury (who sang in a number of Ritwik Ghatak films), Kali Dasgupta, a well-known folk-singer and collector, Khaled Choudhury, and the folk- and mass-singer Hemanga Biswas (whose centenary will be celebrated in 2012) were very close to Kathashilpa.  Montu da, along with Ranajit Singha (a notable poet, folk-song enthusiast and photographer) and Nihar Barua (renowned folk singer), was associated with the Folk Music and Folklore Research Institute. The first and only journal of the institute, published by Kathashilpa, is now a collector's item.  Among drama personalities, Tapas Sen (the lighting wizard of the stage), Subrata Nandi and Asit Basu were regular inmates of Kathashilpa, not to mention Sunil Kumar Chattopadhyay, the eminent Shakespeare and Howard Fast translator).

Three magazines 
In the 1960s, the actor Soumitra Chatterjee and Nirmalya Acharya, the editor of Ekshan, the iconic Bengali little magazine patronized by Satyajit Ray were regular visitors to Kathashilpa, which aspired to combine cultural excellence with left ideology. Kathashilpa acted as the cradle for three important Bengali little magazines: Ekshan in the mid 1960s; Prastuti Parba, in the mid 1970s, during and after the Emergency, and finally in the mid 1980s, Anwesha, a science monthly, edited by the physicist Abhijit Lahiri and the late Siddhartha Ghosh, the historian of science and technology.

The 1970s were a particularly tumultuous period in India marked by left extremism and saw the rise of numerous magazines, little and big. Some of these were suppressed by the authorities. All publications were subject to censorship during the State of Emergency proclaimed by the Government of India in 1975. The quarterly Prastuti Parba was originally published from the residence of Dipendu Chakraborty, a Bengali essayist and professor of English literature, at 32, Rani Harshamukhi Road, Kolkata 700002. Christened 'Prastuti' (Preparation) at its inception, it was ultimately registered as 'Prastuti Parba' (the Preparatory Phase) due to the unavailability of that particular title. The office was shifted to 11, Nrityogopal Chattejee Street, Kolkata 700002, the residence of Prabir Mukhopaddhyay, another associate of the journal. However, during the Emergency in 1975, the regular running of magazines such as Prastuti Parba proved perilous and finally it found refuge at Kathashilpa, 19 Shyamacharan De Street.  Abani Ranjan Ray was bold enough to host this little magazine.  At its peak, Prastuti Parba sold 1,500 copies.

During the fag end of the existence of Prastuti Parba in the early 1980s, some valuable special numbers were brought out, particularly on the great nonsense writer Sukumar Ray and the Hindi/Urdu Fiction writer Prem Chand. The Sukumar Ray issue (edited by Anupam Majumdar and Ashish Lahiri, co-edited by Salil Biswas and Prabrit Das Mahapatra) was specially assisted by his son Satyajit Ray.  He not only designed the cover but also gave permission to print the invaluable personal diary of Sukumar Ray. Sovon Som, the noted art-historian and artist, drew the illustrations. Among the contributors was Sankha Ghosh, the poet and writer.  The key figure behind the Premchand number of Prastuti Praba was the poet Ranajit Singha. Prabhakar Machwe, the Hindi writer, also helped a lot.

In the mid-1980s, Abani Ranjan Ray, assisted by Dhiren Ray, published a science monthly called Anwesha (Search), which immediately drew the attention of the Bengali intelligentsia. It sold at least 2,500 copies at its height.  A special science fiction number of Anwesha carried translations of such legends as Ray Bradbury, Richard Sheckley and Arthur C. Clarke. Anwesha also published special issues on the great Indian Chemist Sir Prafulla Chandra Ray and the great physicist and plant-physiologist Sir Jagadish Chandra Bose, both of which have now become classics. Gouri Prasad Ghosh, the Shakespeare scholar and popular science writer who went on to win both the Rabindra (1994) and the Ananda (2001) awards, was an insider both of Anwesha and Kathashilpa.

Important publications 
Kathashilpa published books encompassing a wide variety of genres. Despite unpredictability of funds, Abani Ranjan Ray did not publish anything he found lacking in taste. This made for some remarkable titles seeing print. Some of the copyrights of these books would later on be bought by large publishing houses. Kathashilpa could not afford to pay royalties to its authors, for whom the books were mostly labours of love. Many of these authors even participated in manning Kathashilpa stalls during the Calcutta Book Fair.

The following selection of the more important titles of Kathashilpa would show the range of its interests:

 Bharatiya Sangeet Kosh (an encyclopedia of Indian Classical Music) by Bimala Kanta Ray Chaudhury, the noted musician. This book has now been published in an enlarged form by another publisher.
 Gana Kabial Ramesh Sil,a research work on a folk performer, edited and compiled by Pulak Chanda, a professor of English literature and an editor of Prastuti Parba.
 Nim Annapurna and Antarjali Jatra (short stories of a new genre by Kamal Kumar Majumdar which have since become Bengali classics. Nim Annapurna has been filmed by Buddhadeb Dasgupta and Antarjali Jatra by Goutam Ghose
 Sundarban by Shibshankar Mitra, a writer who has written extensively on the Sunderbans from personal experience
 Naxalbari and After: a Frontier Anthology in two volumes (ed. Samar Sen, Debabrata Panda and Ashish Lahiri), which is now required reading for the history of the extreme Left Naxalite movement of India in the 1970s. Weekly Frontier and its editor Samar Sen and Kathashilpa had become much closer during the days of the Emergency.
 The Stalin Question by Banbehari Chakrabarty, a noted political activist and theorist.
 Selected poems of Birendra Chattopadhyay and Mani Bhushan Bhattacharya, two major Bengali poets.
 Rakte Bhashe Swadesh Somoy (This Blood-drenched Land and Time, an anthology of revolutionary Bengali poems of the 1970s), ed. Pulak Chanda.
 Chotto Rajputra, (a translation of Le Petit Prince)
 Dolphin Island by Arthur C. Clarke (trans.  Salil Biswas, professor of English literature and retired principal, Heramba Chandra College (South City), Kolkata)
 White Fang by Jack London (trans. Ashish Lahiri, an editor and publisher of Pratuti Parba, translator of J. D. Bernal’s Science in History, co-editor of Ananda award-winning Everyman's Dictionary: English to Bengali, recipient of Rabindra Puraskar for science writing, 2011 )
 Goodbye Mr. Chips by James Hilton (trans. Kalyan Maiti, a teacher of English)
 The Great Train Robbery by Michael Crichton (trans. Kalyan Maiti)
	
In the 1990s, Kathashilpa gradually declined. The political and cultural atmosphere changed with the advent of globalization and the disappointment with leftism in general. Montu Da's health failed and eventually Kathashipa changed hands in 2006. Abani Ranjan Ray died shortly after, in 2008. The establishment, along with a semblance of its famous logo, is still at the same address, but in a new avatar.

See also 
Naxalbari
Naxalite
The Emergency (India)

References

External links 
 An article on Abani Ranjan Ray by Ashish Lahiri (in Bengali)
 Scanned pages from the Special Sukumar Ray issue of Prastuti Parba, with a short introduction by Satyajit Ray
 Archival page on Naxalbari and After: A Frontier Anthology
 http://www.frontierweekly.com/aboutfrontier.html
 https://web.archive.org/web/20120425225759/http://pegasus-press.net/member/pulak_chanda.htm
 The Indian Social Institute Library entry on The Stalin Question

1959 establishments in West Bengal
Book publishing companies of India
Companies based in Kolkata
Indian companies established in 1959
Publishing companies established in 1959